Phyllocnistis exiguella is a moth of the family Gracillariidae, known from Java, Indonesia. The hostplants for the species include Buchanania arborescens and Buchanania florida.

References

Phyllocnistis
Endemic fauna of Indonesia